Pucacaca (in Hispanicized spelling) or Puka Qaqa (Quechua puka red, qaqa rock, "red rock") is one of ten districts of the province Picota in Peru.

References